= 1896 in basketball =

The following are the basketball events of the year 1896 throughout the world.

== Events ==
- September – The YMCA cedes rule-making authority and control of amateur basketball to the U.S. Amateur Athletic Union (AAU).
- Rule IV(1) of the "Official Basket Ball Rules" for the 1896–1897 season is changed to establish that a team consists of only five players. Games previously had featured up to nine players per side, depending on the size of the playing area.
